Gadopsis is a genus of temperate perches endemic to freshwater habitats in southeastern Australia. The genus was formerly considered to be in a family of its own, Gadopsidae.

Species
There are two species in this genus:
 Gadopsis bispinosus Sanger, 1984 (Two-spined blackfish)
 Gadopsis marmoratus J. Richardson, 1848 (River blackfish)

References

 
Percichthyidae
Taxa named by John Richardson (naturalist)
 
Freshwater fish genera